Simon Peter Hoadley (born 16 August 1956) is a former English cricketer.  Hoadley was a right-handed batsman who bowled right-arm off break.  He was born at Eridge, Sussex.

Hoadley made his first-class debut for Sussex against the touring New Zealanders in 1978.  He made eleven further first-class appearances for the county, the last of which came against Somerset in the 1979 County Championship.  In his twelve first-class matches, he scored a total of 329 runs at an average of 17.31, with a high score of 112.  This score was his only first-class century and came against Glamorgan in 1978.  Hoadley also made three List A appearances for Sussex in the 1978 John Player League against Yorkshire, Warwickshire and Middlesex.  He scored just 17 runs at an average of 8.50, with a high score of 17 in these three matches.

His brother, Stephen, also played first-class and List A cricket for Sussex.

References

External links
Simon Hoadley at ESPNcricinfo
Simon Hoadley at CricketArchive

1956 births
Living people
People from Rotherfield
English cricketers
Sussex cricketers